Enrico Cantoreggi (born 5 May 1952) is a former Italian male long-distance runner who competed at one edition of the IAAF World Cross Country Championships at senior level (1974).

References

External links
 Enrico Cantoreggi profile at All-Athletics

1952 births
Living people
Italian male long-distance runners
Italian male steeplechase runners
Italian male cross country runners